Ta-Tung is a food company based in L'Hospitalet de Llobregat, Catalonia, Spain.  The company was founded in 1980 by Ly Kav, a Cambodian who arrived in Barcelona in 1979.  The company produces precooked dishes inspired by oriental cuisine.  The family business has become the leading Spanish producer of precooked Asian food. In addition to Spain, Ta-Tung also exports its products to Italy and Portugal; with plans for expansion to France in 2015.

References

External links

Food and drink companies of Spain
Companies based in Catalonia